The Exchange is a 2011 Israeli drama film directed by Eran Kolirin. The film was screened in competition at the 68th Venice International Film Festival in September 2011.

Plot
Oded (Rotem Keinan) is an assistant lecturer at the Tel Aviv University and married to Tami (Sharon Tal), a young architect looking for a job.  Oded becomes friends with a neighbour, Yoav (Dov Navon), and they become obsessed with breaking pre-ordained frames and examining their lives objectively.

Cast

 Dov Navon as Yoav
 Rotem Keinan as Oded
 Sharon Tal as Tami
 Shirili Deshe as Yael

References

External links
 

2011 drama films
2011 films
2010s Hebrew-language films
Israeli drama films
Films directed by Eran Kolirin